Olivia Alaina May (born October 22, 1985) is an American actress, singer and songwriter. She is best known for her lead role in 18 Year Old Virgin (2009). Most of her work has been in B movies as well as minor characters on network and cable television shows.

May currently performs as a solo artist, and has appeared on a variety of different TV programs. She formerly sang in both the group "Isles" as well as half of the duo "David and Olivia".

Filmography

Film

Television

References

External links

Living people
American film actresses
1985 births
21st-century American women musicians